Aniak is a city in the Bethel Census Area in the U.S. state of Alaska. At the 2010 census the population was 501, down from 572 in 2000.

Geography
 (61.578821, -159.550255).

Climate

Climate is maritime in the summer and continental in winter.

Demographics

Aniak first appeared on the 1940 U.S. Census as an unincorporated village. It formally incorporated in 1972.

As of the census of 2000, there were 572 people, 174 households, and 133 families residing in the city. The racial makeup of the city was 25.00% White, 0.35% Black or African American, 68.36% Native American, 0.52% Asian, and 5.77% from two or more races.  1.05% of the population were Hispanic or Latino of any race.

There were 174 households, out of which 51.1% had children under the age of 18 living with them, 52.9% were married couples living together, 13.2% had a female householder with 0 husbands present, and 23.0% were non-families. 20.7% of all households were made up of individuals, and 4.0% had someone living alone who was 65 years of age or older.  The average household size was 3.29 and the average family size was 3.74.

In the city, the age distribution of the population shows 40.9% under the age of 18, 6.8% from 18 to 24, 27.3% from 25 to 44, 20.3% from 45 to 64, and 4.7% who were 65 years of age or older.  The median age was 28 years. For every 100 females, there were 108.8 males.  For every 100 females age 18 and over, there were 107.4 males.

The median income for a household in the city was $41,875, and the median income for a family was $43,750. Males had a median income of $37,708 versus $34,500 for females. The per capita income for the city was $16,550.  About 11.8% of families and 14.0% of the population were below the poverty line, including 13.4% of those under age 18 and 12.5% of those age 65 or over.

History 

Aniak is the Central Alaskan Yup'ik name for the area around present-day Aniak. The word means "the place where it comes out"; that is, where the Aniak River flows into the Kuskokwim. The local Yup'ik people had deserted the original village at Aniak by the early 19th century, when Russian explorers first arrived in the area.

20th-century prospectors believed that the early Russian traders discovered gold in a tributary to the Kuskokwim called "Yellow River" in 1832. Many think that the Yellow River these traders referred to is the Aniak River. The Russians, however, did not engage in any significant mining activities, and it wasn't until after the purchase of Alaska in 1867 that the American prospectors began seriously investigating the potential for prospecting along the Kuskokwim river. A handful of prospecting parties began venturing into the area, however they had to travel great distances to an area where trading posts were few and far between, so the activity was limited especially given the exposure of other late 19th century strikes in Alaska which were better served by existing infrastructure.

The euphoria caused by the Klondike Gold Rush in 1897-98 would set the stage for a change however with thousands of prospectors across the territory poised to make a rush upon rumor of each potential new strike. One such rush was the Yellow River Stampede of 1900 in which many prospectors left Nome to venture into the Kuskokwim basin upon rumors that someone had found the Yellow River strike despite the fact that the location of that strike was unknown. Finding precious little gold and experiencing substantial hardship, many of these folks would return to Nome following the difficult winter of 1901, but some stayed behind to continue their search. A 1906 gold discovery at the head of the Innoko River, a tributary of the Yukon River, caused another gold rush in 1907 with many of the prospectors choosing to access the site via the Kuskokwim River instead and trading posts were established at the Takotna River which required riverboat service to travel the Kuskokwim river. With riverboat service now available on the Kuskokwim River, prospecting activity picked up and some strikes were starting to occur in the Kuskokwim basin. Strikes were made at Crooked Creek, George River, New York Creek, and Aniak River among others. Most strikes were short lived.  However, the Kuskokwim River was now seeing an increase in river traffic that needed servicing.

In 1910, a lone prospector named "Old Man" Keeler reportedly found placer gold in the Aniak River basin. In 1911, three prospectors, Harry Buhro, E. W. "Kid" Fisher, and Fred Labelle, who had been working the George River area decided to give the Aniak River basin area a try and discovered gold at Marvel, Fisher, and Dome creeks. Initially prospectors would reach this site by poling up the river in boats, however that was a difficult journey due to the nature of the river. The trip would take 15 to 20 days from the Kuskokwim river. The cat trail was last used in the spring of 2006 by miners still working claims.

This same year, Tom L. Johnson homesteaded the site of the long-abandoned Yup'ik village in the Aniak area and opened a store and post office there to service prospectors and miners in the vicinity. Willie Pete and Sam Simeon brought their Yup'ik families from Ohagamiut to Aniak. In 1936 a territorial school was opened. In anticipation of the Lend-Lease program to help supply Russia with war materials, construction of an airfield began in 1939. With the airfield in place, Aniak became the transportation hub for villages in the area including Chuathbaluk, Anvik, Kalskag, Crooked Creek, Holy Cross and others. In 1956 during the Cold War, construction of a White Alice Relay Station began bringing money, jobs, and communication capability to the area. The impact to the community from the relay station was immediate as the first telephone capable of long distance phone calls was installed at the Aniak Lodge in 1957 and Aniak's population more than doubled from 142 in 1950 to 308 in 1960. The 2000 census places Aniak's population at 572.

References

External links

 Aniak at the Community Database Online from the Alaska Division of Community and Regional Affairs
 Maps from the Alaska Department of Labor and Workforce Development: 2000, 2010

Cities in Alaska
Cities in Bethel Census Area, Alaska
Mining communities in Alaska
Road-inaccessible communities of Alaska